The ashy cisticola (Cisticola cinereolus) is a species of bird in the family Cisticolidae. It is found in Ethiopia, Kenya, Somalia, South Sudan, and Tanzania. Its natural habitats are dry savanna, subtropical or tropical dry shrubland, and subtropical or tropical dry lowland grassland.

References

ashy cisticola
Birds of East Africa
Birds of the Horn of Africa
ashy cisticola
Taxonomy articles created by Polbot